Gary Dennis Melchionni (born January 19, 1951) is a retired American professional basketball player who played in the National Basketball Association (NBA) and other leagues. He is a former Phoenix Suns guard and a former All-Atlantic Coast Conference performer while he was with the Duke Blue Devils, where he was the first player to captain twice.  He is the father of former Duke basketball player Lee Melchionni.

Gary captained his Bishop Eustace Prep team to an undefeated 26–0 record and a New Jersey state championship his senior year.  After his professional basketball career, Gary returned to Duke for law school.  He later became President of the Duke alumni association and has had a successful career in law at Stevens and Lee, a Lancaster, PA law firm.

References

External links
Gary Melchionni NBA statistics, basketballreference.com

1951 births
Living people
American men's basketball players
Basketball players from Camden, New Jersey
Bishop Eustace Preparatory School alumni
Duke Blue Devils men's basketball players
Phoenix Suns draft picks
Phoenix Suns players
Point guards